Jorge Quesada (born 12 January 1961) is a Spanish modern pentathlete. He competed at the 1984 and 1988 Summer Olympics.

Quesada was disqualified at the 1988 Summer Olympics after he tested positive for propranolol.

References

1961 births
Living people
Spanish male modern pentathletes
Spanish sportspeople in doping cases
Olympic modern pentathletes of Spain
Modern pentathletes at the 1984 Summer Olympics
Modern pentathletes at the 1988 Summer Olympics